Anthony Fothergill may refer to:

Anthony Fothergill (theologian) (1685–1761), English theological writer
Anthony Fothergill (physician) (1732–1813), English physician